Morris Nunn (27 September 1938 – 18 July 2018) was an English motor racing team owner and engineer. He founded and ran the Ensign Formula One team in the late 1970s and early 1980s, and later worked for Chip Ganassi's highly successful Champ Car team, before founding Mo Nunn Racing for the 2000 season.  
At the urging of Mercedes-Benz Nunn again started a team for the 2002 Indy Racing League season.
The team was sponsored by WorldCom and Hollywood (tobacco) and initially hired Tony Kanaan and Felipe Giaffone.  Giaffone finished 3rd in the 2002 Indianapolis 500 and Kanaan was leading but crashed in the last laps. A third car driven by Jeff Simmons finished ninth.
In 2002, Nunn entered one car each in Champ Car and the rival Indy Racing League. The IRL entry for Giaffone proved more competitive than Kanaan's Champ Car entry, encouraging the team to concentrate purely on IRL a year later. With Toyota and Pioneer backing, the former F1 driver Tora Takagi joined the team. He finished 10th in 2003, while Giaffone missed races because of injuries. He was replaced by Alex Barron, who won the Michigan race. For 2004, only one car was entered, for Takagi, whose performance was not impressive after a heavy crash at Twin Ring Motegi. Other than a joint effort with Fernández Racing at the 2005 Indianapolis 500, Nunn closed the team in 2005 and retired.

Race results

Complete CART FedEx Championship Series results 

(key) (results in bold indicate pole position; results in italics indicate fastest lap; results with * indicate most laps led)

 The Firestone Firehawk 600 was canceled after qualifying due to excessive g-forces on the drivers.

IndyCar Series results
(key)

 Toranosuke Takagi had a 23 points deduction at Texas Motor Speedway due to unacceptable driving.

References

Profile at Grandprix.com

1938 births
2018 deaths
IndyCar Series team owners
English motorsport people
Formula One team owners
Auto racing crew chiefs
People from Walsall
Formula One designers